Yelm is a city in Thurston County, Washington, United States. Its population was 10,617 at the 2020 census. At the beginning of the 21st century, Yelm was the 10th fastest growing city in the state in regard to population.

History

The word "Yelm" is said to come from the Coast Salish word shelm or chelm, meaning "heat waves from the sun", referring to heat mirages.

The Yelm Prairie was originally inhabited by the Nisqually and provided good pasture for their horses. The first permanent non-indigenous settlers came in 1853 to join the Hudson's Bay Company sheep farmers who already conducted business in the area.

James Longmire, one of the first American settlers, said upon arriving in Yelm:

With the coming of the Northern Pacific Railway in 1873, Yelm began to prosper, having found an outlet for its agricultural and forestry products. Its economic base was further enhanced when an irrigation company was formed in 1916, making Yelm a center for commercial production of beans, cucumbers and berries.

Yelm was officially incorporated on December 8, 1924.

During the Great Depression, high maintenance costs and an unstructured water distribution plan bankrupted the Yelm Irrigation Company.

Geography

Yelm is located in southeastern Thurston County, adjacent to its border with Pierce County, along the Nisqually River. The city is near the Nisqually Indian Reservation (located to the northwest on State Route 510), and Joint Base Lewis–McChord on the northeast side of the river. Another major highway, State Route 507, connects Yelm to Centralia and Spanaway near Tacoma.

Demographics

2010 census
As of the census of 2010, there were 6,848 people, 2,299 households, and 1,712 families residing in the city. The racial makeup of the city was 81.6% White, 3.3% African American, 1.8% Native American, 2.3% Asian, 0.9% Pacific Islander, 2.8% from other races, and 7.3% from two or more races. Hispanic or Latino of any race were 9.4% of the population.

There were 2,299 households, of which 53.3% had children under the age of 18 living with them, 51.7% were married couples living together, 17.8% had a female householder with no husband present, 5.0% had a male householder with no wife present, and 25.5% were non-families. 20.3% of all households were made up of individuals, and 8.6% had someone living alone who was 65 years of age or older. The average household size was 2.95 and the average family size was 3.40.

The median age in the city was 29 years. 36% of residents were under the age of 18; 8% were between the ages of 18 and 24; 32.3% were from 25 to 44; 16.1% were from 45 to 64; and 7.6% were 65 years of age or older. The gender makeup of the city was 46.9% male and 53.1% female.

2000 census
As of the census of 2000, there were 3,289 people, 1,216 households, and 807 families residing in the city. The population density was 584.4 people per square mile (225.6/km2). There were 1,323 housing units at an average density of 235.1 per square mile (90.7/km2). The racial makeup of the city was 86.2% White, 1.8% African American, 2.2% Native American, 1.7% Asian, 1.2% Pacific Islander, 1.6% from other races, and 5.4% from two or more races. Hispanic or Latino of any race were 5.35% of the population.

There were 1,216 households, out of which 41.5% had children under the age of 18 living with them, 48.2% were married couples living together, 14.4% had a female householder with no husband present, and 33.6% were non-families. 27.1% of all households were made up of individuals, and 11.6% had someone living alone who was 65 years of age or older. The average household size was 2.67 and the average family size was 3.26.

In the city, the age distribution of the population shows 32.0% under the age of 18, 9.3% from 18 to 24, 31.4% from 25 to 44, 16.6% from 45 to 64, and 10.8% who were 65 years of age or older. The median age was 31 years. For every 100 females, there were 88.5 males. For every 100 females age 18 and over, there were 82.7 males.

The median income for a household in the city was $39,453, and the median income for a family was $45,475. Males had a median income of $32,037 versus $24,474 for females. The per capita income for the city was $15,865. About 7.9% of families and 10.1% of the population were below the poverty line, including 11.3% of those under age 18 and 6.8% of those age 65 or over.

Economy
To a large extent, Yelm acts as a bedroom community for residents working in the surrounding cities of Tacoma, Olympia and Centralia. It also hosts a large number of military families currently or formerly stationed at nearby Joint Base Lewis-McChord.

Yelm experienced significant expansion in the decades surrounding the turn of the 21st century. On February 14, 2017, in consultation with city residents, the city council adopted the Yelm Comprehensive Plan update, which clarifies plans and policies for the city's physical, economic and community development over the next 20 years, including utilities, public transportation and parks.

Parks and recreation

Yelm City Park was donated by Chuck and Wilma Demich in 1950. Located at the corner of SR 507 and Mosman Avenue, it is about one city block in size. It has a kitchen, covered facilities, a playground area, picnic tables, public restrooms and a softball backstop. A number of community events are held there each year, including Prairie Days, Christmas in the Park, Family Fun Day, an annual car show, and the Yelm Lions Easter Egg Hunt.

Yelm has the first Class A Water Reclamation Facility and distribution system in Washington, which reclaims all wastewater for local irrigation and recharge streams. The water is also used in Cochrane Park, an  wetland park that includes a catch-and-release pond for rainbow trout.

Government
Yelm has an elected mayor-council government and is a non-charter code city. The city council, the policy-making branch of Yelm's government, consists of seven members elected at-large to staggered, four-year terms. The mayor is elected at-large and serves as the city's chief executive officer. The mayor and council are supported by the city administrator and several advisory boards and commissions. The city administrator, appointed by the mayor and confirmed by the council, serves as the mayor's chief administrative officer. As described in the Yelm Municipal Code and Revised Code of Washington, certain responsibilities are vested in the city council and the mayor.

Yelm offers a full range of municipal services, provided by seven departments. Sales tax, 8.7% per dollar spent, is distributed as follows:
 Washington State: 6.5%
 Thurston County: 1.4%
 Yelm: 0.8%

Mayor

The current mayor of Yelm is Joe DePinto.

City Council
The seven-member Yelm City Council represents the needs and interests of Yelm's citizens. The council establishes policy for the city, adopts the annual budget, and represents Yelm's interests on regional boards and commissions.

City administration
The Yelm post office serves the surrounding unincorporated Thurston County residential communities in the Bald Hills of Lake Lawrence and Clearwood.

Firefighting services for the cities of Yelm, Rainier and surrounding unincorporated areas are provided by the Southeast Thurston Fire Authority.

Education
Public schools in Yelm belong to the Yelm School District.  Its elementary schools are Fort Stevens, Lackamas, McKenna, Millpond, Southworth and Yelm Prairie. Its secondary school system includes Yelm Middle School, Ridgeline Middle School, Yelm High School, and Yelm Extension School. The private Eagle View Christian School is also in Yelm.

See also
 North Yelm, Washington
 Yelm-Rainier-Tenino Trail
 Ramtha's School of Enlightenment

References

External links
 
 Yelm Chamber of Commerce

Cities in Washington (state)
Cities in Thurston County, Washington